Allium caesioides is a plant species found in the high mountains of India, Pakistan, Tajikistan and Afghanistan. It has an egg-shaped bulb about 10 cm across, a scape up to 30 cm tall, hair-like leaves, and purple flowers.

References

caesioides
Onions
Flora of Afghanistan
Flora of West Himalaya
Flora of Pakistan
Flora of Tajikistan
Plants described in 1969